John (1354–1360) was a Hungarian royal prince of the Capetian House of Anjou. He was the only son of Stephen of Anjou, Duke of Croatia, Dalmatia and Slavonia, and Margaret of Bavaria. He inherited his father's duchies shortly after his birth. He was regarded the heir to his sonless uncle, Louis I of Hungary, who also secured John's right to inherit Poland from Casimir III of Poland. Both Louis I and Casimir III survived John who died prematurely.

Birth

John was the only son of Stephen of Anjou and Margaret of Bavaria. Stephen was the youngest son of Charles I of Hungary. In Hungary, Stephen was regarded the heir to his sonless eldest brother, Louis I of Hungary, but the Polish noblemen forbade Stephen to interfere in Polish affairs when they confirmed, in 1351, Louis's right to inherit Poland from his maternal uncle, Casimir III of Poland. John's mother was the daughter of the Holy Roman Emperor, Louis IV. She came to Hungary in the autumn of 1350.

The date and place of John's birth are unknown. His father was staying in Zagreb when John was born, according to his mother's charter of grant to the Zagreb Chapter. Stephen of Anjou did not visit Zagreb in 1351 and 1352. John's sister, Elizabeth, was born most probably in 1353. Consequently, John must have been born in late 1353 or in 1354, according to historian Éva B. Halász. Stephen had already received Croatia, Dalmatia and Slavonia from Louis I.

Duke 

Stephen died on 9 August 1354. John inherited his father's provinces under the guardianship of his mother. He was regarded the heir to Louis I who also persuaded Casimir III of Poland to adopt John in 1355. Not independently of the war with Venice, Louis I appointed a lieutenant to rule Slavonia in the spring of 1356, and a ban to administer Croatia and Dalmatia in 1357. John, nevertheless, was styled duke of Slavonia, Croatia and Dalmatia in 1358. He died in 1360.

References

Sources

 
 
 
 

|-

1354 births
1360 deaths
House of Anjou-Hungary
Hungarian princes
Dukes of Slavonia
14th-century Hungarian people
Royalty and nobility who died as children